Seo Yong-duk (Hangul: 서용덕; born 10 September 1989) is a South Korean football midfielder.

Career 
Seo joined Omiya Ardija in 2009.
He made his debut for professional league on 18 July 2009 after coming on as a substitute in the 44th minute in Omiya Ardija's 0–3 loss away to FC Tokyo. He was a member of the South Korea national U-20 team for the 2009 FIFA U-20 World Cup.

Club statistics

References

External links

 

Statistics at guardian.co.uk 

1989 births
Living people
South Korean footballers
South Korean expatriate footballers
Association football midfielders
J1 League players
J2 League players
K League 1 players
K League 2 players
Omiya Ardija players
FC Tokyo players
Kataller Toyama players
FC Anyang players
Asan Mugunghwa FC players
Busan IPark players
Expatriate footballers in Japan
South Korean expatriate sportspeople in Japan
Ulsan Hyundai FC players
Yonsei University alumni